Entre Nós is a 2013 Brazilian drama film directed by Paulo Morelli and Pedro Morelli, starring Júlio Andrade, Caio Blat, Carolina Dieckmann, Martha Nowill, Maria Ribeiro, Lee Taylor and Paulo Vilhena.

Plot
Seven young writers friends traveling to a farmhouse to celebrate the publication of the first book of the group. There, they write letters to be opened ten years later. The trip ends in tragedy after the death of one of the friends. Even then, they meet ten years later to read the letters.

Cast
 Júlio Andrade as Cazé
 Caio Blat as Felipe
 Carolina Dieckmann as Lucia
 Martha Nowill as Drica
 Maria Ribeiro as Silvana
 Lee Taylor as Rafa
 Paulo Vilhena as Gus

References

External links
 

Brazilian drama films
2013 drama films
2013 films
2010s Portuguese-language films